Dark Rain Entertainment is a Maldivian production company based in Male' producing Maldivian films. Established in 2006, the studio has produced the first Maldivian films shot entirely in HD, 3D and on DSLR.

History 
The studio's first feature film production was Moomin Fuad's suspense thriller film Happy Birthday (2009) which narrates the story of a simple man who receives a call on his birthday informing him that his wife and son have been kidnapped, only to be returned for a ransom. The film was a commercial failure, despite the positive response from the critics. Winning five Gaumee Film Awards and twelve Maldives Film Awards, the film was also screened at the Venice Film Festival.

The company then paced their production more into a commercial phase with the family drama Dhin Veynuge Hithaamaigaa (2010) starring an ensemble cast including Yoosuf Shafeeu, Niuma Mohamed, Ali Seezan, Mohamed Manik and Ravee Farooq. The film showcases discrimination against the islanders, family revenge and fatherhood responsibilities. It received a positive response from critics for adopting a "unique approach in presenting the concept to the romance-starved Maldivian audience" was particularly noted and was believed to be a "huge improvement" compared to the recent Maldivian films. Their next production venture was the psychological romantic thriller Zaharu (2011) starring Ali Seezan, Niuma Mohamed and Sheela Najeeb. The film centers on a married man who has a weekend affair with a woman who refuses to allow it to end and becomes obsessed with him. The film was inspired from Adrian Lyne-directed American psychological erotic thriller film Fatal Attraction (1987). Upon release it received a mixed response from critics and was declared a "flop" at the box office.

In 2013, they released the horror film Fathis Handhuvaruge Feshun 3D which serves as a prequel to Fathis Handhuvaru (1997) starring Reeko Moosa Manik and Niuma Mohamed in lead roles. It was based on a story by Ibrahim Waheed, Jinaa: Fathis Handhuvaruge Feshun (2009), which itself is a prequel to the story Fathishandhuvaru (1996) written by himself which was later adapted to a film by the same name in 1997. The film was marketed as being the first 3D release for a Maldivian film and the first release derived from a spin-off. Upon release the film received generally negative reviews from critics. The following year, Aishath Fuad Thaufeeq wrote and directed Hulhudhaan featuring Mariyam Majudha and Roanu Hassan Manik which garnered critical success and was later screened at the Venice Film Festival.

In 2015, the studio produced two films. Their first release was the Ali Shifau-directed romantic film Emme Fahu Vindha Jehendhen (2015) starring Mohamed Jumayyil and Mariyam Majudha. The film was declared as the highest grossing Maldivian film  of the year, and was also a critical success. Ravee Farooq was roped in to direct the suspense thriller film Mikoe Bappa Baey Baey which stars Mohamed Manik and Aishath Rishmy in pivotal roles. The film along with his direction and performances were critically acclaimed. It was one of the three entries from the Maldives at the 2016 SAARC Film Festival.

The company collaborated with Ali Shifau, Mohamed Jumayyil and Mariyam Majudha for a romantic comedy film, Vaashey Mashaa Ekee (2016) which emerged as one of the highest grossing Maldivian film of the year. The following year, the studio assigned Ali Shifau to release the romantic comedy film Mee Loaybakee (2017) starring Mohamed Jumayyil alongside Mariyam Azza. The film emerged as one of the highest grossing Maldivian films of 2017. This was followed by a family drama Vakin Loabin (2018), marking Shifau's fourth collaboration with Mohamed Jumayyil and his third collaboration with Mariyam Majudha. The film tells a story of a young couple's divorce and its impact on everyone involved. Upon release, the film met with a positive response from critics, specifically praising the screenplay for toning down its melodrama and breaking from the stereotypes of its genre, and it was a commercial success.

Films produced

Feature film

Short film

Television

References

Dark Rain Entertainment films